Marcinkonys (Polish: Marcinkańce) is a village in Varėna district, Lithuania, located 21 km. south-west of Varėna. It is the administrative center of the Marcinkonys Eldership and it houses the administrations of the Dzūkija National Park and Čepkeliai Nature Reserve. According to the 2020 estimate, it had 591 residents.

Throughout the history the place was under Russian, Polish, and Soviet rules and therefore it may be referred to by multiple names and spellings, including Marcinkańce (Polish name), Martsinkantse (phonemic transliteration of the Polish name), Martsinkantsy (transliteration of the Russified Polish name), and Martsinkonis (transliteration of Russian Марцинконис).
 
The settlement was first mentioned in 1637 as a camp of foresters. It began growing after completion of the railway station in its location for the Warsaw – Saint Petersburg Railway in 1864. 

During the Holocaust, the village had the Marcinkonys Ghetto for the Lithuanian Jews. Some Jews escaped during the liquidation of the ghetto and managed to survive the war.

Marcinkonys village is located c.  from Druskininkai,  from Varėna.

References

Villages in Alytus County
Varėna District Municipality
Białystok Voivodeship (1919–1939)
Belastok Region
Holocaust locations in Lithuania